Chen Xiang (born 13 December 1989), also known as Sean Chen, is a Chinese pop singer and actor. He participated in the nationwide singing contest Super Boy in 2010. In 2011, he released his first album Confession. He is also known for starring in the youth sports drama The Whirlwind Girl.

Discography

Albums

Extended plays

Singles

Filmography

Film

Television series

Variety show

Awards

References

Living people
1989 births
People from Tianshui
Chinese male television actors
Chinese male voice actors
Singers from Gansu
Male actors from Gansu
Super Boy contestants
21st-century Chinese male actors